HMS Jonquil was a  of the British Royal Navy. The corvette, named after the flower genus Jonquil, served in the Second World War.

Laid down by the company Fleming and Ferguson on 27 December 1939 and launched on 9 July 1940, Jonquil entered service on 20 October and assumed convoy responsibilities the following month. Her first deployment was as an escort for Convoy WS.5A, bound for the West African port of Freetown.

Jonquil survived the war but was relegated to the reserve at Gibraltar from August 1945. Bought by Greece, the corvette was renamed Lemnos and was converted into a merchant vessel. Redesignated Olympic Rider in 1951, Jonquil sank after a collision with Olympic Cruiser in the Antarctic in 1955.

Notes

References
 
 Mason, Geoffrey B (2005), Chronologies of War Service of Royal Navy Warships: HMS Jonquil - Flower-class Corvette, naval-history.net. Retrieved 22 July 2009.

 

Flower-class corvettes of the Royal Navy
1940 ships